Karolína Bednárová (born ) is a Czech female volleyball player. She was part of the Czech Republic women's national volleyball team.

She participated in the 2013 FIVB Volleyball World Grand Prix. On club level she played for PTSV Aachen in 2013.

References

External links
 Profile at FIVB.org

1986 births
Living people
Wing spikers
Czech women's volleyball players
People from Frýdlant
Sportspeople from the Liberec Region